Henri Massé (2 March 1886 – 9 November 1969) was a 20th-century French orientalist. He was first professor of Arabic and Persian literatures at the faculté des lettres d'Alger, then professor of Persian language at the École nationale des langues orientales vivantes of Paris (1927–1958), of which he was administrator from 1948 to 1958 and a member of the Académie des Inscriptions et Belles-Lettres.

Selected bibliography 
 Croyances et coutumes persanes, suivies de Contes et chansons populaires, Paris, Librairie orientale et américaine, 1938
 Le Livre des merveilles du monde, Paris, 1944
 Anthologie persane, XIe - XIXe siècles, dernière réédition (2004) dans la Petite Bibliothèque Payot, n°330, 
 L'Islam, Édition Armand Colin, Paris  (Section d'histoire et sciences économiques), 5e édition revue, 1948
 Essai sur le poète Saadi, Librairie orientaliste Paul Geuthner
 Les épopées persanes : Firdousi et l'épopée nationale, 
 Croyances et coutumes persanes (2 vol.), G. P. Maisonneuve
 Le Béharistan de Djami (traduit du persan), Librairie orientaliste Paul Geuthner
 Contes en persan populaire (recueillis et traduits), Imprimerie nationale
 L'exposé des religions d'Abou'l-Maâli (translated from Persian), Éditions Leroux
 Mélanges d'orientalisme offerts à Henri Massé... à l'occasion de son 75e anniversaire, Téhéran, Impr. de l'université, coll. * 1963: Publications of the University of Tehran

References

External links 
 Bibliothèque Henri Massé UFR d'études arabes et hébraïques, Paris IV Sorbonne
 Obituary on Persée
 Bibliothèque Henri Massé

French orientalists
French Iranologists
Translators to French
Translators from Persian
Academic staff of the University of Algiers
Members of the Académie des Inscriptions et Belles-Lettres
1886 births
1969 deaths
20th-century French translators
Shahnameh Researchers